Bricka is a surname. Notable people with the surname include:

Carl Frederik Bricka (1845–1903), Danish archivist, historian, and writer
Rémy Bricka (born 1949), French musician and singer